The Southeastern Spanish ibex or Beceite ibex (Capra pyrenaica hispanica) is a goat that is endemic to Spain. 

The Southeastern Spanish ibex inhabits the Sierra Nevada, Sierra de las Nieves Natural Park, Sierra de Cazorla, Sierra de Grazalema, Montes de Málaga, in Andalucia. It also occurs in the Sierra Morena. Outside Andalucia, it can be found in the Montes de Toledo and in the mountains all along the Spanish Mediterranean, with populations as far north as southern Catalonia. From there it might one day colonise the Pyrenees, which were formerly home to another subspecies of the Spanish ibex.

Capra (genus)